Yao Zongxun (Simplified Chinese: 姚宗勋; Traditional Chinese: 姚宗勛; Pinyin: Yáo Zōngxūn; 1917–1985) was the formal successor of Wang Xiangzhai, founder of the martial art Yiquan. He is also the father of Yao Chengguang and Yao Chengrong both currently teaching in Beijing, China.

References

External links
  Article: Master Yao Zongxun and the Development of Yiquan,
 Images of Master Yao Zongxun and Son

Chinese wushu practitioners
1917 births
1985 deaths